The 2022 European Championships were the second edition of the European Championships. It was a multi-sport event which took place in Munich, Germany from 11 to 21 August 2022. The tournament began three days after the conclusion of the 2022 Commonwealth Games.

Athletics, Cycling, Triathlon, Women's Artistic Gymnastics, Men's Artistic Gymnastics and Rowing returned after appearing in the inaugural Championships in 2018. New to this edition of the Championships were Beach Volleyball, Canoe Sprint, and, for the first time, a full slate of para-sport events, Sport Climbing and Table Tennis.

Unlike the 2018 European Championships, Swimming, Diving, Artistic swimming and Open water swimming were not part of the program of the event, as the 2022 European Aquatics Championships were held  at the same time but in Rome, Italy. Golf, in the form of the European Golf Team Championships did not return in 2022.

Venues

Olympiastadion – athletics (track & field events)
Odeonsplatz – athletics (marathon & race walking)
Königsplatz – beach volleyball, sport climbing
Oberschleißheim Regatta Course – canoe sprint, rowing
Messe München – cycling (track)
Murnau am Staffelsee – cycling (men's road race)
Fürstenfeldbruck – cycling (road time trial)
Landsberg am Lech – cycling (women's road race)
Olympiapark – cycling (BMX freestyle, mountain bike), triathlon
Olympiahalle – artistic gymnastics
Rudi-Sedlmayer-Halle – table tennis

Calendar
The schedule was as follows:

All times and dates use Central European Summer Time (UTC+2)

Medal table

Results and Standings

Official results and standings ec2022results.com

Participating teams
As a result of the 2022 Russian invasion of Ukraine, athletes from Russia and Belarus were banned from competing at the 2022 European Championships. Two athletes participated as the Athlete Refugee Team. The five British competitors in table tennis were listed as representing England. One athlete was listed as representing World Triathlon.

The official list of participating teams was as follows:

 Greenland (GRL) (1)

 World Triathlon (1)

See also
Munich 2022 (disambiguation)

References

External links

 
European Championships
European Championships
2022
Multi-sport events in Germany
European Championships